Silke Müller (born 11 November 1978) is a field hockey midfielder from Germany, who won the gold medal with the German National Women's Team at the 2004 Summer Olympics in Athens, Greece.

(Senior) National Team achievements
 2000 – European Indoor Nations Cup, Vienna (1st place)
 2002 – World Cup, Perth (7th place)
 2003 – Champions Challenge, Catania (1st place)
 2003 – European Nations Cup, Barcelona (3rd place)
 2004 – Olympic Qualifier, Auckland (4th place)
 2004 – Summer Olympics, Athens (1st place)
 2004 – Champions Trophy, Rosario (2nd place)
 2005 – European Nations Cup, Dublin (2nd place)
 2005 – Champions Trophy, Canberra (5th place)
 2006 – European Indoor Nations Cup, Eindhoven (1st place)
 2006 – Champions Trophy, Amstelveen (1st place)
 2006 – World Cup, Madrid (8th)

(Senior) club achievements

 1997 – German Indoor Hockey League (1st place)
 2001 – German Field Hockey League (1st place)
 2002 – German Indoor Hockey League (1st place)
 2002 – European Indoor Hockey Cup (1st place)
 2003 – German Indoor Hockey League (1st place)
 2003 – European Indoor Hockey Cup (1st place)
 2004 – German Indoor Hockey League (1st place)
 2004 – European Indoor Hockey Cup (1st place)
 2004 – German Field Hockey League (1st place)
 2005 – German Indoor Hockey League (1st place)
 2005 – European Indoor Hockey Cup (1st place)
 2006 – Dutch Indoor Hockey League (1st place)

References

Profile on Hockey Olympica

External links
 

1978 births
Living people
German female field hockey players
Olympic field hockey players of Germany
Field hockey players at the 2004 Summer Olympics
Olympic gold medalists for Germany
Olympic medalists in field hockey
Medalists at the 2004 Summer Olympics
21st-century German women